Eucalyptus arachnaea, commonly known as the black-stemmed mallee, is a mallee or tree that is endemic to  Western Australia. It has rough, stringy bark, lance-shaped leaves and white flowers in groups of up to thirteen.

Description
It has rough, stringy, dark grey to greyish black bark. Flowering occurs mainly from April to May.

Taxonomy and naming
The black-stemmed mallee was first formally described in 1867 by George Bentham who gave it the name Eucalyptus redunca var. melanophloia and published the description in Flora Australiensis. In 1991, Ian Brooker and Stephen Hopper raised the variety to species status but since the name Eucalyptus melanophloia was already used, it was necessary to create a new specific epithet. They raised the name Eucalyptus arachnaea, the epithet is derived from the Latin arachnaeus meaning "spidery", referring to the spidery cluster of flower buds.

Brooker and Hopper described two species that have been accepted by the Australian Plant Census:

Distribution and habitat
Black-stemmed mallee is found in breakaways, slopes and gullies from coastal areas of the Mid West and extending south through the Wheatbelt region of Western Australia. It is common between Northampton in the north to Brookton where it grows in sandy-clay-loamy soils over granite or laterite.

Subspecies arrecta is only known from the type location near Morawa.

Conservation status
This mallee is classified as "not threatened", but subspecies arrecta is classified as "Priority Three" by the Government of Western Australia Department of Parks and Wildlife, meaning that it is poorly known and known from only a few locations but is not under imminent threat.

See also
List of Eucalyptus species

References

Eucalypts of Western Australia
Trees of Australia
arachnaea
Plants described in 1991
Taxa named by Ian Brooker
Taxa named by Stephen Hopper